Catholic Junior College (CJC) is a junior college in Singapore, offering a two-year course for pre-university students leading to the Singapore-Cambridge GCE Advanced Level examination. Founded in 1975, Catholic Junior College was the third junior college to be established in Singapore.

History
Plans for a junior college operated by the Catholic mission was first announced by then-Prime Minister Mr Lee Kuan Yew at the opening of National Junior College in May 1970, as one of several planned to be set up. Subsequently, the Catholic mission disclosed plans for a fund-raising campaign in June 1970.

Construction on the college campus was underway by July 1974, and was expected to have a capacity of 1,500 students. CJC took in its first batch of 500 students in January 1975, but as the college campus was not ready, the students initially attended classes at other Catholic schools. The first section of the college, comprising four tutorial blocks, was completed in March 1975, while the rest of the campus was completed by August that year. With the college's opening, pre-university students that were then attending classes in Catholic schools moved over to the college.

In March 1977, the college set up a co-operative. In the late 1970s, CJC formulated its own moral education syllabus designed specifically for its students. Consisting of role-playing and sharing sessions, it took into account ideas from students shared during engagement sessions. In 1985, the college campus was upgraded at a cost of $1 million.

Principal

School identity and culture

Crest

The principal symbol of Catholic Junior College is the Holy Spirit.The school crest was redesigned and unveiled in 2013.

Motto
The College motto "In Veritate et Caritate" translates as "In Truth and Love".

Uniform & Attire 
Catholic Junior College's uniform is themed in a light shade of blue. The uniform was designed by the first batch of CJ students. Male students wear plain light blue shirts with light blue pants while female students wear light blue blouses with light blue skirts. A collar pin bearing the flame insignia of the College is worn on the left collar of the uniform. Navy blue blazers and ties are worn during important ceremonies and events.

The PE uniform consists of a blue t-shirt with the crest on the left side of the shirt and the college flame and abbreviation on the back of the t-shirt, and black shorts with the college flame and abbreviation on the bottom left. It is typically only worn for PE lessons and CCA sessions.

Students are also allowed to wear a polo "dress-down" shirt. This consists of a navy blue shirt with the crest on the left side of the shirt and white stripes on both sleeves and on the sides. This shirt also includes the college motto on the back. Students may order a set of shirts with their CCA listed on the left sleeve of the polo. Student leaders are given a separate polo shirt upon completion of the Leadership Training Camp, which is the same as the regular polo shirt except for the removal of the white stripes in favor of an all-blue shirt, and a shortened form of the college's mission "Thinker with a Mission, Leader with a Heart" imprinted on the back instead of the college motto.

On Friday, students are allowed to wear their house t-shirt, which may be red, orange, yellow or green depending on the student's house. Sports leaders may wear a polo shirt variation.

Admission & affiliation
Catholic Junior College is affiliated to all Catholic schools in Singapore that offer secondary education.

Students from the affiliated institutions are entitled to two additional point reduction to their L1R5 raw scores for their GCE Ordinary Level examination results when applying for admission into CJC as the first choice (a maximum of 4 reduction points to L1R5 score is allowed for JC Joint Admission Exercise, with the exception for appeals through Language Elective Programmes to participating pre-university centres, which allows up to a maximum of 6 reduction points).

Campus 
Catholic Junior College is located off Whitley Road, and was built on a site previously occupied by the British forces.

Academic information 

Catholic Junior College offers Arts and Science courses that leads up to the Singapore-Cambridge GCE Advanced Level examinations.

Academic subjects

Co-curricular activities (CCAs) 
The list of co-curricular activities (or CCAs) offered at Catholic Junior College are listed below.

Notable alumni
Tan Chorh Chuan, President, National University of Singapore
Jessica Tan Soon Neo, Member of Parliament for East Coast GRC
Cheryl Chan, Member of Parliament for East Coast GRC
Phua Siok Gek Cynthia, Former Member of Parliament for Aljunied GRC
Chia Yong Yong, Singaporean lawyer, disability advocate and a Nominated Member of Parliament of Singapore
Paulin Tay Straughan, Professor of Sociology and Vice Dean, Faculty of Arts and Social Sciences, National University of Singapore; Nominated Member of Parliament
Tan Cheng Han, former Dean, Faculty of Law, National University of Singapore
Tan Kheng Hua, actress, comedian, playwright
Christine Tan, CNBC anchor
Tay Ping Hui, MediaCorp artiste
Jacelyn Tay, MediaCorp artiste
Joan Pereira, Member of Parliament
Madeleine Lim, award-winning filmmaker, producer, director, cinematographer and LGBTQ activist
Colette Wong, Fox Sports Asia presenter
Gerald Koh, Radio Presenter & Assistant Programme Director of 987FM
Cheryl Koh, pastry chef
John Yap, Co-Founder, Awfully Chocolate

See also
 Education in Singapore

References 

1975 establishments in Singapore
Junior colleges in Singapore
Educational institutions established in 1975
Catholic Junior College alumni
Novena, Singapore